The King of the Circus Ring (German:Der König der Manege) is a 1921 German silent film directed by Joseph Delmont and starring Luciano Albertini, Angelo Rossi and Alfred Haase.

The film's art direction was by Willi Herrmann.

Cast
 Luciano Albertini as Luciano Sansone  
 Angelo Rossi 
 Alfred Haase 
 Joseph Delmont 
 Ellen Ulrich 
 Linda Albertini
 Umberto Guarracino 
 Frau Schlieben

References

Bibliography
 John Holmstrom. The moving picture boy: an international encyclopaedia from 1895 to 1995. Michael Russell, 1996.

External links

1921 films
Films of the Weimar Republic
Films directed by Joseph Delmont
German silent feature films
Circus films
German black-and-white films